Acrolophus harparsen is a moth of the family Acrolophidae. It is found in Puerto Rico.

References

Moths described in 1931
Taxa named by William Trowbridge Merrifield Forbes
harparsen